The earthen dam is a project of the United States Bureau of Reclamation and was completed in 1963, at  high and  long at its crest.  The dam impounds the Florida River for flood control and irrigation water storage, operated by the local Florida Water Conservancy District.  120 kW of hydroelectric power is generated here.

See also
List of largest reservoirs of Colorado

References 

Dams in Colorado
Reservoirs in Colorado
United States Bureau of Reclamation dams
Buildings and structures in La Plata County, Colorado
Earth-filled dams
Dams completed in 1963
Dams in the Colorado River basin
Bodies of water of La Plata County, Colorado
1963 establishments in Colorado